"Lounger" is a pop rock song performed by British band Dogs Die in Hot Cars, released as the third single from their debut album, Please Describe Yourself. It was written by lead singer and guitarist Craig Macintosh and band member Gary Smith, and, alongside the rest of the album, produced by Clive Langer and Alan Winstanley.

Reception
According to The Independent, it is "a song about an overeducated, lazy bohemian" with lyrics such as "I get up when I want/Don't have to eat my greens/Or keep my bedroom tidy" guaranteed to appeal to students. The song was called the album's "telling moment" by Pitchfork Media, whilst Stylus said that it "fizzes along like no-one’s business, guitar on super-jangle and piano set to hyper-jaunty." It reached a peak of 43 on the UK Singles Chart, thereby becoming the last Dogs Die in Hot Cars single, and indeed release, to chart.

Track listing
UK CD single 1
"Lounger" – 3:40

UK CD single 2
"Lounger" – 3:40
"Mandarins" – 4:50

International CD single
"Lounger" – 3:40
"Mandarins" – 4:50
"Good Grief"

7" picture disc
"Lounger" – 3:38
"Lounger" (A cappella) – 3:39

References

External links
"Lounger" 7" picture disc at Discogs

2004 singles
2004 songs
V2 Records singles
Song recordings produced by Clive Langer
Song recordings produced by Alan Winstanley